The Ministers of the Crown Act 1937 (C.38) was an Act of the Parliament of the United Kingdom that set salaries for members of the government and opposition. It is notable as the first Act to formally recognise the Prime Minister, the Cabinet and the Leader of the Opposition.

Act
The Act set out salaries for government ministers and certain members of the opposition. Although applying to "ministers" it did not define ministers and indeed excluded two of them: the Lord Chancellor and Attorney General for England and Wales. The Act first gave the salary for the Prime Minister, which was set at £10,000 a year. This was only the second time that the Prime Minister had been mentioned in an Act of Parliament, after the Chequers Estate Act 1917, which granted them a country residence at Chequers.

The other officials covered by the Act fell into two categories – heads of department, and under-secretaries. Heads of certain departments, such as the Chancellor of the Exchequer, received £5,000 a year regardless of their membership in the Cabinet, while others such as the Lord Privy Seal received £3,000, with an increase to £5,000 if they come to sit in the Cabinet. The under-secretaries were granted £3,000 a year if Chief Whip, £2,000 if Financial Secretary to the Treasury, £1,500 if Financial Secretary to the Admiralty or similar and £1,000 if Assistant Postmaster-General. The Act also gave a pension of £2,000 a year to any individual who had served as Prime Minister, and a salary of £2,000 to the Leader of the Opposition.

The Act is notable for several reasons; it was the first Act of Parliament to directly deal with ministerial salaries, and also the first Act to provide a salary for the Prime Minister, and for the Leader of the Opposition, whose duties it defined. It was the first statute to formally recognise the Prime Minister, the Cabinet and the Leader of the Opposition. The Act was repealed by the Ministerial Salaries Consolidation Act 1965.

Notes and references
Notes
UK CPI inflation numbers based on data available from Measuring Worth: UK CPI

References

Bibliography
 
 

United Kingdom Acts of Parliament 1937
Government of the United Kingdom
Repealed United Kingdom Acts of Parliament
Government ministers of the United Kingdom